Nur Mohammad is a Member of Parliament in Bangladesh from Kishorganj 2. He was earlier a Bangladeshi ambassador and also the Inspector General of Police of Bangladesh Police during 2007–2010. In October 2012, he was appointed as the Youth and Sports Secretary by the Government of Bangladesh.

Education and career
Nur obtained his bachelor's and master's degrees in history from the University of Dhaka. He belonged to the 1982 batch of BCS (police) cadre. He served in UN mission in Kosovo (UNMIK). He served as the additional inspector general (IGP-administration) of police headquarters (PHQ). In August 2011, he was appointed as the ambassador of Bangladesh to Morocco.

In 2012, a parliamentary body submitted a special report on the 2007 University of Dhaka campus violence. It held several officials, including Nur, responsible for "inhuman torture" on teachers and students during the campus unrest and recommended bringing them to book under existing laws.

Since 2015, Nur has been serving as the managing partner of Centre for Policy Research, Bangladesh.

In 2018, Nur received the Nomination from Bangladesh Awami League to run for the National Elections from his hometown Kishoreganj. On the 30th of December, 2018, he was declared the new Member of Parliament from Kishoreganj-2, with significantly higher votes; against that of his opponent Akhtaruzzaman Ranjan from BNP.

Personal life
Nur is married to Ismat Nur. They have 3 children, Nusrat Nur(35) working for IOM, Barrister Omar Mohammad Nur(30) involved in several businesses and Fariha Nur(25) studying at North South University. His oldest daughter Nusrat Nur Badhon's husband Captain Mazharul Haider died in the 2009 BDR Mutiny incident.

References

Living people
People from Kishoreganj District
University of Dhaka alumni
Inspectors General of Police (Bangladesh)
Place of birth missing (living people)
Date of birth missing (living people)
11th Jatiya Sangsad members
Ambassadors of Bangladesh to Morocco
Year of birth missing (living people)
Criminal Investigation Department (Bangladesh) officers